34th Regiment or 34th Infantry Regiment may refer to:

 34th (Cumberland) Regiment of Foot, a unit of the United Kingdom Army
 34 (Northern) Signal Regiment, a unit of the United Kingdom Army
 34th Infantry Regiment (United States), a unit of the United States Army
 34th Infantry Regiment (Greece)

 American Civil War regiments
 34th Regiment Indiana Infantry
 34th Illinois Volunteer Infantry Regiment
 34th Iowa Volunteer Infantry Regiment
 34th Regiment Kentucky Volunteer Infantry
 34th Ohio Infantry
 34th Wisconsin Volunteer Infantry Regiment

See also
 34th Division (disambiguation)
 34th Brigade (disambiguation)
 34th Squadron (disambiguation)